The American Journal of Pathology is a monthly peer-reviewed medical journal covering pathology. It is published by Elsevier on behalf of the American Society for Investigative Pathology, of which it is an official journal. The editor-in-chief is Martha B. Furie (Stony Brook University). The journal was established in 1896 as the Journal of the Boston Society of Medical Sciences and renamed The Journal of Medical Research in 1901, before obtaining its current title in 1925. According to the Journal Citation Reports, the journal has a 2020 impact factor of 4.307.

Editors 
The following persons have been editors-in-chief of the journal:

References

External links
 

Publications established in 1896
Pathology journals
Monthly journals
Elsevier academic journals
English-language journals
Academic journals associated with learned and professional societies of the United States